Pepusch is a surname. Notable people with the surname include:

 Francesca Pepusch (1680–1746), Italian singer
 Johann Christoph Pepusch (1667–1752), German composer